A planet symbol (or planetary symbol) is a graphical symbol used in astrology and astronomy to represent a classical planet (including the Sun and the Moon) or one of the modern planets. The symbols were also used in alchemy to represent the metals associated with the planets, and in calendars for their associated days. The use of these symbols derives from Classical Greco-Roman astronomy, though their current shapes are a development of the 16th century.

The classical planets, their symbols, days and most commonly associated planetary metals are: 

The International Astronomical Union (IAU) discourages the use of these symbols in modern journal articles, and their style manual proposes one- and two-letter abbreviations for the names of the planets for cases where planetary symbols might be used, such as in the headings of tables.
The modern planets with their traditional symbols and IAU abbreviations are: 

The symbols of Venus and Mars are also used to represent female and male in biology following a convention introduced by Carl Linnaeus in the 1750s.

History

Classical planets
Antecedents of the planetary symbols are attested in the attributes given to classical deities. The Roman planisphere of Bianchini (2nd century, currently in the Louvre, inv. Ma 540) shows the seven planets represented by portraits of the seven corresponding gods, each a bust with a halo and an iconic object or dress, as follows: Mercury has a caduceus and a winged cap; Venus has a necklace and a shining mirror; Mars has a war-helmet and a spear; Jupiter has a laurel crown and a staff; Saturn has a conical headdress and a scythe; the Sun has rays emanating from his head; and the Moon has a crescent atop her head.

The written symbols for Mercury, Venus, Jupiter, and Saturn have been traced to forms found in late Greek papyri. Early forms are also found in medieval Byzantine codices which preserve horoscopes.

A diagram in the astronomical compendium by Johannes Kamateros (12th century) closely resemble the 11th-century forms shown above, with the Sun represented by a circle with a single ray, Jupiter by the letter zeta (the initial of Zeus, Jupiter's counterpart in Greek mythology), Mars by a shield crossed by a spear, and the remaining classical planets by symbols resembling the modern ones, though without the cross-marks seen in modern versions of Mercury, Venus, Jupiter and Saturn. These cross-marks first appear in the late 15th or early 16th century. According to Maunder, the addition of crosses appears to be "an attempt to give a savour of Christianity to the symbols of the old pagan gods."
The modern forms of the classical planetary symbols are found in a woodcut of the seven planets in a Latin translation of Abu Ma'shar al-Balkhi's De Magnis Coniunctionibus printed at Venice in 1506, represented as the corresponding gods riding chariots.

Earth symbol

Earth is not one of the  classical planets, as "planets" by definition were "wandering stars" as seen from Earth's surface. 
Earth's status as planet is a consequence of heliocentrism in the 16th century.
Nonetheless, there is a pre-heliocentric symbol for the world, now used as a planetary symbol for the Earth. This is a circle crossed by a horizontal and vertical line, representing the world divided by four rivers into the four quarters of the world (often translated as the four "corners" of the world): . A variant, now obsolete, had only the horizontal line: .

A medieval European symbol for the world – the globus cruciger,  (the globe surmounted by a Christian cross) – is also used as a planetary symbol; it resembles an inverted symbol for Venus. 

Classical planets

Moon

The crescent shape has been used to represent the Moon since earliest times. In classical antiquity, it is worn by lunar deities (Selene/Luna, Artemis/Diana, Men, etc.) either on the head or behind the shoulders, with its horns pointing upward. 
The representation of the moon as a simple crescent with the horns pointing to the side (as a heraldic crescent increscent or crescent decrescent) is attested from late Classical times.

The same symbol can be used in a different context not for the Moon itself but for a lunar phase, as part of a sequence of four symbols
for "new moon" (U+1F311 🌑︎), "waxing" (U+263D ☽︎), "full moon" (U+1F315 🌕︎) and "waning" (U+263E ☾︎).

Mercury

The symbol  for Mercury is a caduceus (a staff intertwined with two serpents), a symbol associated with Mercury/Hermes throughout antiquity. Some time after the 11th century, a cross was added to the bottom of the staff to make it seem more Christian.

The  symbol has also been used to indicate intersex, transgender, or non-binary gender. A related usage is for the 'worker' or 'neuter' sex among social insects that is neither male nor (due to its lack of reproductive capacity) fully female, such as for example worker bees. It was also once the designated symbol for hermaphroditic or 'perfect' flowers, but botanists now use  for these instead.

Venus

The Venus symbol, ♀, consists of a circle with a small cross below it. 
It has been interpreted as a depiction of the hand-mirror of the goddess, which may also explain Venus's association with the planetary metal copper, as mirrors in antiquity were made of polished copper (alloy), though this is not certain. In the Greek Oxyrhynchus Papyri 235, the symbols for Venus and Mercury didn't have the cross on the bottom stroke, and Venus still appears without the cross (⚲) in Johannes Kamateros (12th century). 

In  botany and biology, the symbol for Venus is used to represent the female sex, alongside the symbol for Mars representing the male sex, following a convention introduced by Linnaeus in the 1750s. Arising from the biological convention, the symbol also came to be used in sociological contexts to represent women or femininity.

Sun

The modern astronomical symbol for the Sun, the circumpunct, was first used in the Renaissance. It possibly represents Apollo's golden shield with a boss; it is unknown if it traces descent from the nearly identical Egyptian hieroglyph for the Sun. 

Bianchini's planisphere, produced in the 2nd century, shows  a circlet with rays radiating from it.
In late Classical times, the Sun is attested as a circle with a single ray. A diagram in Johannes Kamateros' 12th century Compendium of Astrology shows the same symbol. Both symbols have been used alchemically for gold, as have more elaborate symbols showing a disk with multiple rays or even a face.

Mars

The Mars symbol, ♂, is a depiction of a circle with an arrow emerging from it, pointing at an angle to the upper right in Europe and to the upper left in India. As astrological symbol it represents the planet Mars. It is also the old and obsolete symbol for iron in alchemy. In zoology and botany, it is used to represent the male sex (alongside the astrological symbol for Venus representing the female sex), following a convention introduced by Linnaeus in the 1750s.

The symbol dates from at latest the 11th century, at which time it was an arrow across or through a circle, thought to represent the shield and spear of the god Mars; in the medieval form, for example in the 12th-century Compendium of Astrology by Johannes Kamateros, the spear is drawn across the shield. The Greek Oxyrhynchus Papyri show a different symbol, perhaps simply a spear.

Jupiter

The symbol for Jupiter, ♃, is originally a Greek zeta, Ζ, with a stroke indicating that it is an abbreviation (for Zeus, the Greek equivalent of Roman Jupiter).

Saturn

Salmasius and earlier attestations show that the symbol for Saturn, ♄, derives from the initial letters (Kappa, rho) of its ancient Greek name , with a stroke to indicate an abbreviation. By the time of Kamateros (12th century), the symbol had been reduced to a shape similar to a lower-case letter eta η, with the abbreviation stroke surviving (if at all) in the curl on the bottom-right end. The horizontal stroke was added along with the "Christianization" of other symbols in the early 16th century.

Modern discoveries

Uranus
 
 
The symbols for Uranus were created shortly after its discovery in 1781. One symbol, ⛢, invented by J. G. Köhler and refined by Bode, was intended to represent the newly discovered metal platinum; since platinum, commonly called white gold, was found by chemists mixed with iron, the symbol for platinum combines the alchemical symbols for iron, ♂, and gold, ☉. Gold and iron are the planetary metals for the Sun and Mars, and so share their symbols. Several orientations were suggested, but an upright arrow is now universal.

Another symbol, ♅, was suggested by Lalande in 1784. In a letter to Herschel, Lalande described it as "" ("a globe surmounted by the first letter of your name"). The platinum symbol tends to be used by astronomers and the monogram by astrologers.

Neptune
 
 
Several symbols were proposed for Neptune to accompany the suggested names for the planet. Claiming the right to name his discovery, Urbain Le Verrier originally proposed to name the planet for the Roman God Neptune and the symbol of a trident, while falsely stating that this had been officially approved by the French Bureau des Longitudes. In October, he sought to name the planet Leverrier, after himself, and he had loyal support in this from the observatory director, François Arago, who in turn proposed a new symbol for the planet, ⯉. However, this suggestion met with resistance outside France, and French almanacs quickly reintroduced the name Herschel for Uranus, after that planet's discoverer Sir William Herschel, and Leverrier for the new planet, though it was used by anglophone institutions.
Professor James Pillans of the University of Edinburgh defended the name Janus for the new planet, and proposed a key for its symbol. Meanwhile, Struve presented the name Neptune on December 29, 1846, to the Saint Petersburg Academy of Sciences. In August 1847, the Bureau des Longitudes announced its decision to follow prevailing astronomical practice and adopt the choice of Neptune, with Arago refraining from participating in this decision.
The planetary symbol was Neptune's trident, with the handle stylized either as a cross , following Mercury, Venus and the asteroids, or as an orb , following the symbols for Uranus and Earth. The cross variant is the more common today.

Pluto
 
 
Pluto was almost universally considered a planet from its discovery in 1930 until its re-classification as a dwarf planet (planetoid) by the IAU in 2006. Planetary geologists and astrologers continue to treat it as a planet. The original planetary symbol for Pluto was a monogram of the letters P and L. Astrologers generally use a bident with an orb. NASA has used the bident symbol since Pluto's reclassification.

Minor planets

In the 19th century, planetary symbols for the major asteroids were also in use, including 1 Ceres (a reaper's sickle, encoded ), 2 Pallas (a lance) and 3 Juno (a sceptre, encoded ).
Encke (1850) used symbols for 5 Astraea, 6 Hebe, 7 Iris, 8 Flora and 9 Metis in the Berliner Astronomisches Jahrbuch.

In the late 20th century, astrologers abbreviated the symbol for 4 Vesta (the sacred fire of Vesta, encoded ), and introduced new symbols for 5 Astraea (a stylised % sign, shift-5 on the keyboard for asteroid 5), 10 Hygiea (a caduceus – a common error in the USA for a staff of Asclepius, itself an error for the snake symbol of Hygiea – encoded ) and for 2060 Chiron, discovered in 1977 (a key). Chiron's symbol was adapted as additional centaurs were discovered; symbols for 5145 Pholus and 7066 Nessus have been encoded in Unicode. The abbreviation of the Vesta symbol is now universal, and the astrological symbol for Pluto has been used astronomically for Pluto as a dwarf planet.

All (except Eris, for which the hand of Eris is a traditional Discordian symbol) were devised by Denis Moskowitz, a software engineer in Massachusetts.

Additional symbols 
From 1845 to 1855, many symbols were created for newly discovered asteroids. But by 1851, the spate of discoveries had led to a general abandonment of these symbols in favour of numbering all asteroids instead.

Moskowitz, who designed symbols for the trans-Neptunian dwarf planets, also designed symbols for the smaller trans-Neptunian objects Varuna, Ixion, and Salacia. Others have proposed symbols for even more trans-Neptunian objects, e.g. Zane Stein for Varda. Although mentioned in the Unicode proposal for the other dwarf planets, they lack broader adoption.

See also

Astrological symbol
Astronomical symbol
Gender symbol
Classical planets in Western alchemy

References

Alchemical symbols
Astronomical symbols
History of astrology